Jiangdu Road Subdistrict is a subdistrict inside of Hebei District, Tianjin, China. It shares border with Jianchang Avenue Subdistrict in the north, Yueyahe Subdistrict in the east, Changzhou Avenue Subdistrict in the south, and Wangchuanchang Subdistrict in the west. In 2010, it had  a total population of 60,561.

The subdistrict was created as Bahao Road Subdistrict in 1981. In 1983 It was named after Jiangdu Road within the region.

Geography 
Jiangdu Road Subdistrict is on the south of Beitang Drainage River.

Administrative divisions 
At the time of writing, Jiangdu Road Subdistrict covers 8 residential communities, all of which are listed below:

References 

Township-level divisions of Tianjin
Hebei District, Tianjin